Riley Keaton Adams (born June 26, 1996) is an American professional baseball catcher for the Washington Nationals of Major League Baseball (MLB). He played college baseball for the San Diego Toreros of the University of San Diego. In 2021, he made his debut with the Toronto Blue Jays before being traded to Washington.

High school and college
Adams was born on June 26, 1996, in Encinitas, California. He attended Canyon Crest Academy in San Diego, California. There he was a two-sport athlete, playing basketball and baseball. In basketball, Adams once recorded 31 rebounds in one game. In baseball, he made the school's varsity baseball team in his freshman year as a shortstop. He switched to catcher as a sophomore, when his coach asked him to move to fill the open position. The Chicago Cubs selected Adams in the 37th round, with the 1,099th overall selection, of the 2014 Major League Baseball draft, but he did not sign so that he could enroll at the University of San Diego.

Adams played college baseball for the San Diego Toreros. In the summer of 2016, he played collegiate summer baseball for the Orleans Firebirds of the Cape Cod Baseball League, and was named a league all-star. Adams was twice named a semifinalist for the Johnny Bench Award. As a junior in 2017, he won the West Coast Conference Player of the Year Award, and finished his collegiate career with a .305 batting average, 24 home runs, and 110 runs batted in in 159 games played.

Professional career

Toronto Blue Jays

The Toronto Blue Jays selected Adams in the third round of the 2017 Major League Baseball draft, with the 99th overall selection. They signed him to a contract with a $542,000 signing bonus. Adams made his professional debut with the Vancouver Canadians of the Class A-Short Season Northwest League, and went on to start in the Northwest / Pioneer League All-Star Game. Adams played in 52 games for the Canadians in 2017, and hit .305 with three home runs and 35 RBI.

In 2018, Adams played for the Dunedin Blue Jays of the Class A-Advanced Florida State League where he slashed .246/.352/.361 with four home runs and 43 RBIs in 99 games. In 2019 he appeared in 81 games for the Double-A New Hampshire Fisher Cats, hitting .258 with 11 home runs.

Adams did not play in a game in 2020 due to the cancellation of the Minor League Baseball season because of the COVID-19 pandemic. He was added to the Blue Jays 60-man player pool for the 2020 season but did not get called up. On November 20, 2020, Adams was added to the 40-man roster. 

On May 2, 2021, Adams was promoted to the major leagues for the first time after backup catcher Alejandro Kirk was placed on the 10-day injured list with left hip flexor discomfort. On May 5, Adams was optioned to Triple-A without making a major league appearance. On June 8, Adams was again recalled to the active roster. He made his MLB debut that day as the starting catcher against the Chicago White Sox. In the game, he notched his first career hit, a double off of White Sox starter Carlos Rodón.

Washington Nationals
Adams was traded to the Washington Nationals for reliever Brad Hand on July 29, 2021. He notched his first hit as a National, as well as his first career home run and RBIs, off Atlanta Braves reliever Will Smith in the ninth inning, giving his team the late lead, on August 7, 2021.

Personal life
Adams began practicing karate at the age of three. He earned a second degree black belt when he was 13 years old, and then began to focus on his baseball career. His elder brother, Cameron, played college baseball at Washington University in St. Louis.

Adams was an accomplished science fair competitor, notably for his studies of pampas grass which resulted in his participation in the California State Science Fair. Adams was also a standout high school basketball player, earning All League honors as a sophomore, junior and senior.

References

External links

1996 births
Living people
American expatriate baseball players in Canada
Baseball players from California
People from Encinitas, California
Major League Baseball catchers
Toronto Blue Jays players
Washington Nationals players
San Diego Toreros baseball players
Orleans Firebirds players
Vancouver Canadians players
Dunedin Blue Jays players
New Hampshire Fisher Cats players
Buffalo Bisons (minor league) players
Rochester Red Wings players
Anchorage Glacier Pilots players
La Crosse Loggers players